

The Farman F.150  was a 1920s French twin-engined biplane designed by Farman as a day bomber.

Development
The F.150 was a twin-engined unequal-span biplane to the B.3 specification, which could be fitted with fixed landing gear or floats. Although the design was an improvement on the earlier Goliath, it did not increase in performance, and it was not ordered into production.

Variants
F.150The original B.3 version powered by 2x  Gnome et Rhône 9Aa 9-cylinder radial piston engines, of which only one was built.
F.150bis a smaller version powered by 2x  Lorraine 12Db V-12 piston engines, of which only two were built.
F.150 Marin( Marine) Floatplane bomber for Aeronavale.

Specifications (F.150)

Notes

Bibliography

1920s French bomber aircraft
F.0150